A businessman, businessperson, or businesswoman is an individual who has founded, owns, or holds shares in (including as an angel investor) a private-sector company. A businessperson undertakes activities (commercial or industrial) for the purpose of generating cash flow, sales, and revenue by using a combination of human, financial, intellectual, and physical capital with a view to fueling economic development and growth.

History

Prehistoric period: Traders 
Since a "businessman" can mean anyone in industry or commerce, businesspeople have existed as long as industry and commerce have existed. "Commerce" can simply mean "trade", and trade has existed through all of recorded history. The first businesspeople in human history were traders or merchants.

Medieval period: Rise of the merchant class 
Merchants emerged as a "class" in medieval Italy (compare, for example, the Vaishya, the traditional merchant caste in Indian society). Between 1300 and 1500, modern accounting, the bill of exchange, and limited liability were invented, and thus the world saw "the first true bankers", who are certainly businesspeople.

Around the same time, Europe saw the "emergence of rich merchants." This "rise of the merchant class" came as Europe "needed a middleman" for the first time, and these "burghers" or "bourgeois" were the people who played this role.

Renaissance to Enlightenment: Rise of the capitalist 
Europe became the dominant global commercial power in the 16th century, and as Europeans developed new tools for business, new types of "business people" began to use those tools. In this period, Europe developed and used paper money, cheques, and joint-stock companies (and their shares of stock). Developments in actuarial science and underwriting led to insurance. Together, these new tools were used by a new kind of businessperson, the capitalist. These people owned or financed businesses as investors, but they were not merchants of goods. These capitalists were a major force in the Industrial Revolution.

The Oxford English Dictionary notes the earliest known use of the word "business-men" in 1798, and of "business-man" in 1803. By 1860 the spelling "businessmen" had emerged.

Modern period: Rise of the business magnate 
The newest kind of corporate executive working under a business magnate is the manager. One of the first true founders of management profession was Robert Owen (1771–1858). He was also a business magnate in Scotland. He studied the "problems of productivity and motivation", and was followed by Frederick Winslow Taylor (1856–1915), who was the first person who studied work with the motive to train his staff in the field of management to make them efficient managers capable of managing his business. After World War I, management became popular due to the example of Herbert Hoover and the Harvard Business School, which offered degrees in business administration (management) with the motive to develop efficient managers so that business magnates can hire them with the goal to increase productivity of the private establishments business magnates own.

Salary 
Salaries for businesspeople vary. The salaries of businesspeople can be as high as billions of dollars per year. For example, the owner of Microsoft, Bill Gates makes $4 billion per year. The high salaries which businesspeople earn have often been a source of criticism from many who believe they are paid excessively.

Entrepreneurship 
Entrepreneurship is the creation or extraction of value. With this definition, entrepreneurship is viewed as change, generally entailing risk beyond what is normally encountered in starting a business, which may include other values than simply economic ones. An entrepreneur is a person who sets up a business or businesses.

See also 

 Business Magnate
 Business
 Entrepreneur
 Media Proprietor
 Corporate
 Salaryman
 White-collar worker

References 

Business occupations

Entrepreneurship